Katalin Nagy (May 5, 1979 in Eger, Hungary) is an ultramarathon runner and member of the USA National 24hr Ultramarathon Team.

IAU 24 Hour World Champion
Nagy first appeared on the ultramarathon scene in 2012 finishing on the podium at the Croom Zoom 50 km Run and winning the 50 mile road run event of the Keys 100 Ultramarathons in Florida. Since then she became the first American female runner to win the IAU 24 Hour World Championship in Turin in April 2015.
She also led the US Women’s Team to its third consecutive world championship victory  with a record breaking team championship performance of 720.046 km with team mates Traci Falbo and Maggie Guterl.

Ultramarathon career 
She took her first major international ultramarathon title at Ultrabalaton, a 212 km run around Lake Balaton, Hungary in 2013. 
Her victory list also includes the South Carolina 24 Hour Race (2014), the Keys 100 Ultramarathons 100 mile event (2014), two wins at the Desert Solstice 24 Hour Track Run (2014, 2015) and a 246 km Athens to Sparta Spartathlon victory with a record time of 25:07:12 ahead of Alyson Venti and former course record holder Szilvia Lubics.

Personal best performances

References

1979 births
Living people
American female ultramarathon runners
American female marathon runners
Hungarian emigrants to the United States
Hungarian female marathon runners
Sportspeople from Sarasota, Florida
Track and field athletes from Florida
Hungarian female long-distance runners
Hungarian ultramarathon runners
21st-century American women